Am I A Hindu? is a primer about the Hindu religion, published in 1992, by Ed Viswanathan.

The book takes the form of dialog between a Hindu father and his American-born son. The son wants to understand his family's religious traditions and discover what is relevant for him today. The book provides a non-technical introduction to Hinduism as lived today. The Book tries to answer lot of questions about Hinduism very objectively and from a point of view of someone who doesn't know the religion well and whose information is vituperous.

The book emphasizes that Hinduism is about the search of true knowledge, search of self, search of answers to all questions, at the end it also says that the day science will be able to answer all questions, all religion like Hinduism will cease to exist. The Book tries to answer questions by quoting similarities with other religion and without trying to show any other religion in a bad light, explains that how the broadness of Religion, which gives freedom to believe in god and at the same time be an atheist, pray the Idols or only the holy scriptures has led to many wrong beliefs about the religion.

It also explains that how a religion, with no system of conversion has survived over ages. As said its in the form of dialogues thus answers questions very objectively.

External links 
 Am I A Hindu? The book deals with subjects like the self, the Brahman Hindu marriages, Hindu traditions, Hindu atheism and Hindu sciences.

1992 non-fiction books
Hinduism studies books